The Israel national under-21 football team is the national under-21 football team of Israel and is controlled by the Israel Football Association (IFA). It is considered to be the feeder team for the senior Israel national football team.

It has recently qualified for the European Championships to be held in the Netherlands after beating the French under-21 team 2–1 on aggregate.

This team consists of Israeli players aged 21 or under at the start of each two-year UEFA European Under-21 Football Championship campaign, so players can be, and often are, up to 23 years old. Team members may also simultaneously qualify to various teams for Under-20s (for non-UEFA tournaments), Under-19s and Under 17s, or even the senior national team, so long as the meet the respective age restriction.  It is also possible to play for one country at youth level and another at senior level (provided the player is eligible).

The U-21 team has been constructed, following the Israel's acceptance as a full member of UEFA. A draw in a qualifier against Greece in Greece was Israel U-21s' first result in 1990.

Israel U-21s do not have a permanent home. They play in stadia dotted all around Israel in an attempt to encourage fans in all areas of the country to get behind Israel. Because of the lesser appeal compared to the senior national team, smaller grounds are usually used (such as HaMoshava Stadium in Petah Tikva, Israel).

Competition history
There is no Under-21 World Cup, although there is an Under-20 World Cup. European U-21 teams compete for the European Championship, with the finals every even-numbered year. It will be held in odd-numbered years from 2007. Israel has never fared well in European Under-21 Football Championships.

The current campaign started shortly after the 2006 finals – the qualification stage of the 2007 competition.  UEFA have decided to shift the next tournament forward to avoid a clash with senior tournaments taking place in even-numbered years.  The competition has therefore been reduced as qualifying must be completed in a year's less time.  In their three-team qualification group, Israel finished ahead of Turkey and Wales. In the two-legged play-off against France for a place in the final stage, the team achieved a surprising 1–1 draw in France and won the home match 1–0, with Amir Taga scoring in stoppage time.

Note: The year of the tournament represents the year in which it ends.

Competitive Record

UEFA European Under-21 Championship Record

All-time players stats

Top Appearances

Note: Club(s) represents the permanent clubs during the player's time in the Under-21s.

Top Goalscorers

Note: Club(s) represents the permanent clubs during the player's time in the Under-21s.

UEFA European Under-21 Championship

2023 UEFA European Under-21 Championship qualification

2023 UEFA European Under-21 Championship play-offs 

The four play-off winners qualify for the final tournament.

All times are CEST (UTC+2), as listed by UEFA (local times, if different, are in parentheses).

|}

2023 UEFA European Under-21 Championship (Final tournament) group stage

Results and fixtures

2021

2022

1–1 on aggregate. Israel won 3–1 on penalties and qualified for the 2023 UEFA European Under-21 Championship.

2023

Coaching staff

Players

Current squad
 The following players were called-up for the friendly matches.
 Match dates: 16 and 19 November 2022
 Opposition:  and 
 Caps and goals correct as of: 27 September 2022, after the match against

Recent call-ups
The following players have previously been called up to the Israel under-21 squad in the last 12 months and remain eligible for selection.

See also
 UEFA European Under-21 Football Championship
 Israel national football team
 Israel national under-19 football team
 Israel national under-18 football team
 Israel national under-17 football team
 Israel national under-16 football team

References

External links
 Uefa Under-21 website Contains full results archive
 The Rec.Sport.Soccer Statistics Foundation Contains full record of U-21 Championship hosts and additional statistics, such as the Group Winners table for the 1998 qualifiers.

European national under-21 association football teams
F
Youth football in Israel